Harkin's General Store is all that remains of West Newton, in Nicollet County, Minnesota, United States. Alexander Harkin opened the store as combination general store and post office in 1867 in the growing town of West Newton. The town fell into decline after four years of locust swarms devastated southern Minnesota, and the railroad extended away from West Newton. The store closed in 1901.

Most of the stock was left when the store was closed and abandoned, and remains today as a museum currently managed by the Minnesota Historical Society.

References

External links
Minnesota Historical Society: Harkin Store
Harkin's Historic Store

Commercial buildings on the National Register of Historic Places in Minnesota
Living museums in Minnesota
Minnesota Historical Society
Minnesota state historic sites
Museums in Nicollet County, Minnesota
National Register of Historic Places in Nicollet County, Minnesota
General stores in the United States